Count Alexis de Sakhnoffsky (born 12 November 1901, Kiev, Kiev Governorate, Russian Empire (present day Ukraine) –  Died: April 27, 1964, Atlanta, Georgia, United States) was a Russian-American industrial designer, known principally for his Streamline-style automotive designs.  

Sakhnoffsky was born in Kiev, Russian Empire. The Sakhnovskys were well-known since the Ukrainian cossack period. They are united with other Cossack Hetman families such as the Zabilas, the Lysenkos, the Bezborodkos, and the Polubotkos as well as famous noble families like the Gogol-Yanovskys, the Tereschenkos, and others. Sakhnoffsky came from a wealthy aristocratic family. He was the son of Prince Vladimir Sakhnovsky, who was the new commandant of the station port in the First World War, the port manager of the Petrograd customs office, and chairman of the acceptance of vehicles supplied by Russia's allies. The prince committed suicide in 1917. Sakhnoffsky's mother was M. I. Tereshchenko's (millionaire and sugar industrialist) daughter. The family had a "Mercedes" car, which led to a creative future fate of the artist. 

After his father's death in 1917 Sakhnoffsky joined the army of White Russian General Pyotr Wrangel. In early 1920 after the Bolshevik revolution he emigrated from his motherland. At first he lived in Paris, where his mother's aunt lived. Then he emigrated to Switzerland in 1919 and by the 1920s had become a well-known designer of European sports cars.  He relocated to North America in 1929 and was employed by the Hayes Body Corporation where he did design work for several Hayes customers like Auburn, Cord, and American Austin automobiles. The 1929 Cord L-29 he designed for himself (and which was built at Hayes) won the Grand Prize at the 1929 Monaco Concours d'Elegance and the Grand Prix d'Honneur at the 1929 Beaulieu Concours. He went to Packard in the early 1930s, and although he did not stay there for long he helped set the company's design direction for the next several years. De Sakhnoffsky later did work for White trucks among others.

In the early 1950s Sakhnoffsky teamed up with Preston Tucker (after Tucker's tumultuous acquittal from an SEC trial over the Tucker '48) funded by investors from Brazil. They began initial designs to build a sports car called the Tucker Carioca. But Tucker's travels to Brazil were plagued by fatigue and upon his return to the United States he was diagnosed with lung cancer. Tucker died from pneumonia as a complication of lung cancer. The Tucker Carioca was never developed.

Sakhnoffsky also completed numerous other design projects including bicycles, kitchen items, and furniture. He served as a technical editor for Esquire magazine from 1934 until the 1960s.

References

External links
 de Sakhnoffsky work for the Hayes Body Corporation at coachbuilt.com
 His work in Canada with Smith Bros. (Labatts, Seagrams)

1901 births
1964 deaths
Ukrainian automobile designers
American automobile designers
Soviet emigrants to Switzerland
Swiss emigrants to the United States
American people of Ukrainian descent